Jože Poklukar (born 30 January 1973) is a Slovenian biathlete. He competed at the 1994 Winter Olympics and the 1998 Winter Olympics.

References

External links
 

1973 births
Living people
Slovenian male biathletes
Olympic biathletes of Slovenia
Biathletes at the 1994 Winter Olympics
Biathletes at the 1998 Winter Olympics
Sportspeople from Jesenice, Jesenice
20th-century Slovenian people